2014 Irish elections may refer to:

Republic of Ireland
2014 Irish local elections
2014 European Parliament election in Ireland

Northern Ireland
2014 Northern Ireland local elections